Stramonita is a genus of predatory sea snails, marine gastropod molluscs in the subfamily Rapaninae of thefamily Muricidae, the rock snails.

Species
The genus Stramonita contains the following species:
 Stramonita alderi Petuch & Berschauer, 2020
Stramonita biserialis (Blainville, 1832)
 Stramonita brasiliensis Claremont & D.G. Reid, 2011 
 Stramonita buchecki Petuch, 2013
Stramonita canaliculata (Gray, 1839)
Stramonita delessertiana (Orbigny, 1841)
Stramonita floridana (Conrad, 1837)
Stramonita haemastoma (Linnaeus, 1767)
Stramonita rustica (Lamarck, 1822)
Species brought into synonymy
 Stramonita armigera (Link, 1807) accepted as Mancinella armigera Link, 1807
 Stramonita bicarinata (Blainville, 1832) accepted as Stramonita rustica (Lamarck, 1822)
Stramonita bicarinata (Blainville, 1832): synonym of Stramonita rustica (Lamarck, 1822)
Stramonita blainvillei (Deshayes, 1844): synonym of Stramonita delessertiana (Orbigny, 1841)
Stramonita chocolata (Duclos, 1832): synonym of Thaisella chocolata (Duclos, 1832)
Stramonita hederacea Schumacher, 1817: synonym of Nassa serta (Bruguière, 1789)
 Stramonita muricina (Blainville, 1832) accepted as Semiricinula muricina (Blainville, 1832)

References

 Gofas, S.; Le Renard, J.; Bouchet, P. (2001). Mollusca, in: Costello, M.J. et al. (Ed.) (2001). European register of marine species: a check-list of the marine species in Europe and a bibliography of guides to their identification. Collection Patrimoines Naturels, 50: pp. 180–213
 Claremont M., Williams S.T., Barraclough T.G. & Reid D.G. (2011) The geographic scale of speciation in a marine snail with high dispersal potential. Journal of Biogeography 38: 1016-1032.
 Claremont M., Vermeij G.J., Williams S.T. & Reid D.G. (2013) Global phylogeny and new classification of the Rapaninae (Gastropoda: Muricidae), dominant molluscan predators on tropical rocky seashores. Molecular Phylogenetics and Evolution 66: 91–102.

External links
 Schumacher, C. F. (1817). Essai d'un nouveau système des habitations des vers testacés. Schultz, Copenghagen. iv + 288 pp., 22 pls.

 
Rapaninae